Predestination is a 2014 Australian science fiction action-thriller film written and directed by Michael and Peter Spierig. The film stars Ethan Hawke, Sarah Snook, and Noah Taylor, and is based on the 1959 short story " '—All You Zombies—' " by Robert A. Heinlein.

Plot

In March 1975, an agent stops a bombing of a public building in New York City, but is caught in a gunfight, containing the bomb too late and suffering severe burns. Someone unseen helps him grasp his time-travel device, which he uses to retreat to his employer's facility in 1992. The agent considers his mission a failure because the "Fizzle Bomber," the unidentified serial-bombing fugitive he confronted, remains at large and will carry out his bombing on another day, ultimately killing over ten thousand.

The agent recovers from his injuries, but facial reconstruction surgery and vocal cord damage have altered his face and voice. His superiors force his imminent retirement due to the dangers of the extensive time travel undertaken over the course of his career. His doctor diagnoses him with symptoms of psychosis and depression, but does not disclose this.

The agent is sent on his final mission. Working undercover in 1970 New York City as a bartender, he converses with a customer who writes true confession articles under the pen name "The Unmarried Mother". The reticent customer begins telling his own life story after much prompting.

Born female, the customer grew up as Jane in a Cleveland orphanage. Superior in intellect and physical strength but plain in appearance, Jane suffered as an unloved outcast and was never adopted. These qualities, however, led a man named Robertson to recruit her for SpaceCorp, a space flight organization seeking young women as R&R companions for male astronauts. During Jane's aptitude testing, a physical examination revealed an undiscovered, disqualifying medical condition. Keeping this a secret, Robertson rejected Jane under a pretense while promising to re-enlist her.

In 1963, Jane fell in love with a man by a chance encounter, briefly finding happiness before the man deserted her one day. Robertson finally revealed to Jane that SpaceCorp was a front to recruit elite operatives with no family ties for a secret government agency, but Jane became disqualified again due to being pregnant by her lover. While performing a Caesarean section, doctors discovered Jane was intersex. As a result of a forced hysterectomy due to birth complications, Jane underwent gender reassignment through an ordeal of extensive surgeries. Amidst all this, her baby was abducted by an unidentified man. Resenting her lover for ruining her life, Jane adopted the name of John and eventually moved to New York City.

The agent offers John the chance to take revenge on his lover scot-free, in return for John taking over the agent's job. The agent time travels with John to Cleveland in 1963, admitting that he works for Robertson's secret agency, the Temporal Bureau, which uses time travel to prevent crimes. Following instructions for finding Jane in the past, John unwittingly falls in love with his younger self and realizes that the agent set him up to become Jane's lover. Despite knowing that their love is doomed, John cannot bring himself to break off their relationship.

Deviating from his mission, the agent illegally time travels to March 1975 to pursue the Fizzle Bomber once more. The Fizzle Bomber beats him in combat, leaving him to witness, and help, his earlier burned self. The agent expects to be punished by execution, but Robertson excuses him, dismissing the Bureau's protocols.

Continuing his mission, the agent brings Jane's baby, born from her self-fertilization by John, back in time to the Cleveland orphanage in 1945. Thus, Jane, John, and their baby are the same person, a predestination paradox. The agent returns to 1963 and convinces John to leave Jane at the preordained time, inducting John into the Temporal Bureau in 1985 and completing his mission. Robertson extols the importance of John's future role at the Bureau as a unique operative with no ties to the past or future. The agent still regrets his failure to stop the Fizzle Bomber, but Robertson credits the Fizzle Bomber for motivating the Bureau's growth and success.

The agent chooses to retire to New York City in 1975 shortly before the March attack; arriving, he decommissions his time-travel device as planned, but the device remains operational. He also finds that Robertson gave him an exact location and time where the Fizzle Bomber will be found. There, he discovers that the Fizzle Bomber is his future self, who claims that his bombings averted greater death tolls in alternate futures. The Bomber also claims that Robertson set up this path for him. Vowing that he will not become the Bomber, the agent guns down his older self.

John's surgical scars are shown on the agent's body, confirming that Jane, John, the agent, and the Fizzle Bomber are all the same person. Robertson knowingly orchestrated this agent's existence, responsible for both his own conception and death. On a tape recording left for John, the agent contemplates whether the future can be changed.

Cast

 Ethan Hawke as Agent Doe / Fizzle Bomber (listed in film's end credits as "The Barkeep")
 Sarah Snook as Jane/John (listed as "The Unmarried Mother")
Monique Heath as 10-year-old Jane
Olivia Sprague as 5-year-old Jane
 Noah Taylor as Mr. Robertson
 Madeleine West as Mrs. Stapleton
 Christopher Kirby as Agent Miles
 Freya Stafford as Alice
 Jim Knobeloch as Dr. Belfort
 Christopher Stollery as The Interviewer
 Tyler Coppin as Dr. Heinlein
 Rob Jenkins as Mr. Jones
 Ben Prendergast as Dr. Clarke

Production

Development

The film is based on the 1959 short story "—All You Zombies—" by Robert A. Heinlein. At one point in an internal monologue in the film, the narrator quotes the story title. On 14 May 2012, the Spierig brothers—who had already written a screenplay—were announced as the directors of Predestination. Peter Spierig explained in August 2014 that they remained close to Robert A. Heinlein's 1959 short story. They did not try to take apart the logic of the more than 50-year-old narrative: "... so we [Spierig brothers] worked on the [premise] that if there was a way to pick apart the logic, over that time it would have been done by now. We kind of say, 'let's trust the short story and trust that logic', so we stuck very closely to it."

Hawke was selected for the lead role, while Wolfhound Pictures and Blacklab Entertainment collaborated to produce the film. Hawke explained in November 2014 that he is a longtime fan of the science fiction genre, but prefers its human elements, rather than special effects:
Whether it's Robert Heinlein, Kurt Vonnegut, Philip K. Dick, H. G. Wells or whoever ... that kind of mind-bendy science-fiction where you can really attack themes in a new way. And when I read Predestination it was like: "What the f*** did I just read?!"

Distribution
Arclight Films had bought the international rights to the film, and on 18 May 2012, Tiberius Film attained the German rights to the film from Arclight. On 23 May 2012, Sony Pictures Worldwide Acquisitions acquired the American and some international rights to the film.

Financing
On 5 September 2012, Screen Australia announced that it would finance the film as part of a A$4.8 million (US$3.6 million) investment in three feature films.

Casting
On 28 February 2013, Snook signed on to star in one of the film's lead roles, followed by Taylor, who joined the cast of the film on 13 May 2013. Also in 2013, Pinnacle Films secured the Australian and New Zealand distribution rights to the film.

Filming
On 19 February 2013, pre-production was scheduled to begin on 25 February 2013, while shooting was scheduled to begin on 8 April 2013 in Melbourne,  for a duration of six weeks. By 13 May 2013, filming was underway. Some scenes were shot at the Abbotsford Convent, located in the inner-city Melbourne suburb of Abbotsford, the foyer of 333 Collins Street, the University of Melbourne old quad, and at the RMIT Design Hub.

In regard to Snook, the Spierig brothers explained to the media that they always seek to cast a lesser-known actor in their films. Michael Spierig later compared Snook's acting ability to that of fellow Australian actress Cate Blanchett. They also said that they prefer to film in Australia, with its rebates and incentives, but will film in any geographical location.

Release
Predestinations global premiere was held on 8 March 2014 at the SXSW Film Festival in Austin, Texas, US. The film was then selected for the opening night gala of the Melbourne International Film Festival (MIFF), held at the Hamer Hall venue on 31 July 2014 in Melbourne, Australia. The MIFF promotional material described Predestination as a "distinctive blend of sci-fi, noir and crime fiction with a Bukowskian streak." The Sydney premiere of the film, which also featured a live Q&A session with the directors, occurred on 6 August 2014 at the Palace Verona cinema.

The film went on general release in the United Kingdom on 13 February 2015. Following the release of two trailers, and a seven-minute excerpt that was published on 3 December 2014, Predestination premiered on 9 January 2015 in the United States.

Critical response
On review aggregator Rotten Tomatoes, the film had a score of 84% based on 111 reviews, with an average rating of 6.9 out of 10. The site's critical consensus stated: "Fun genre fare with uncommon intelligence, Predestination serves as a better-than-average sci-fi adventure—and offers a starmaking turn from Sarah Snook." The film also has a score of 69 out of 100 on Metacritic based on reviews from 28 critics, indicating "generally favorable reviews".

Variety magazine's review of the film called it an "entrancingly strange time-travel saga" that "succeeds in teasing the brain and touching the heart even when its twists and turns keep multiplying well past the point of narrative sustainability." In anticipation of the MIFF opening night's screening, the Sydney Morning Herald'''s National Film Editor Karl Quinn called Snook's performance a "career-making role". In terms of the plot, Quinn states that it is "intriguing" even though it could "unravel at the slightest tug on a thread of loose logic."

The lead character was variously described as transgender or intersex in different media articles. Hawke told The Guardian that the narrative is relevant to all people: "There's something about Predestination'' that actually does get at identity, for me".

Accolades

See also
 List of time travel works of fiction
 List of LGBT-related films
 "I'm My Own Grandpa", a song mentioned in Heinlein's story and partially heard in the film

References

External links
 
 
 
 
 

2014 films
2010s English-language films
2014 action thriller films
2010s mystery thriller films
2010s science fiction thriller films
Australian action thriller films
Australian mystery thriller films
Dystopian films
Films about contract killing
Films about intersex
Films about orphans
Films based on science fiction short stories
Films based on works by Robert A. Heinlein
Films directed by Spierig brothers
Films set in 1945
Films set in the 1960s
Films set in 1963
Films set in 1970
Films set in 1975
Films set in Cleveland
Films set in New York City
Films shot in Melbourne
Time loop films
Films about time travel
Australian science fiction thriller films
LGBT-related science fiction thriller films
Australian LGBT-related films
Films about trans men
2014 LGBT-related films
Screen Australia films
LGBT-related science fiction films